David Sias (born June 2, 1987 in Fountain Valley, California) is an American soccer player.

Career

Youth and amateur
Sias attended Fountain Valley High School, played club soccer for the Wolfpack Soccer Club with coach Kevin Smith, and played college soccer at University of California, Irvine, where he was named to the All-Big West second team in 2007, and was a 2008 Big West scholar-athlete, majoring in economics. He was also named Big West Defender of the Year his senior year.

During his college years, Sias also played with Orange County Blue Star in the USL Premier Development League.

Professional
Sias was drafted in the third round (43rd overall) in the 2009 MLS SuperDraft by Chicago Fire, but was not offered a professional contract with the team; instead, he joined the USL First Division expansion franchise Austin Aztex in March 2009. He made his professional debut on April 18, 2009, in Austin's USL1 season opener against Minnesota Thunder.

He was released by the Aztex at the end of the 2009 season.

References

External links
 Austin Aztex bio
 UC Irvine profile

Living people
1987 births
American soccer players
Austin Aztex FC players
Orange County Blue Star players
USL League Two players
USL First Division players
UC Irvine Anteaters men's soccer players
Chicago Fire FC draft picks
Soccer players from California
Association football defenders